Operation Batman was a Second World War raid by British Commandos near Cherbourg France in November 1942. The men that took part in the raid were drawn from No. 12 Commando and No. 62 Commando.

References 

Conflicts in 1942
World War II British Commando raids
1942 in France
Military history of Normandy